The Mostri men's basketball team, commonly known as Mostri, was the men's basketball team of Golfklúbburinn Mostri in Stykkishólmur, Iceland. It played in the 2. deild karla and the Icelandic Men's Basketball Cup from 2006 to 2013. It was the runner-up in 2. deild karla in 2013 and won promotion to 1. deild karla but folded after the season. They were known for their pink and black uniforms.

Honours
2. deild karla
Runner-up: 2013

Seasons

References

External links
Profile at Icelandic Basketball Federation

Basketball teams in Iceland